Times Leader is a privately owned newspaper in Wilkes-Barre, Pennsylvania.

Times Leader may also refer to:
 The Times Leader (Kentucky), a newspaper in Caldwell County, Kentucky
 Martins Ferry Times Leader, a newspaper in Belmont County, Ohio
 Daily Times Leader, a newspaper in West Point, Mississippi
 Times leader, a leading article in The Times of London

See also 
 Leader Times